Mark Francis Mercenes Swainston (born 13 November 1999) is an English-born Filipino professional footballer who currently plays as a midfielder for Hong Kong Premier League club Eastern.

Early life
Mark moved to Hong Kong before his first birthday. He would study in Island School. in Sha Tin along with now-professional Rory Lonergan and Barak Braunshtain.

Club career

Kitchee 
He joined Kitchee in 2014 and was promoted to their senior squad in July 2016. However, in December 2016 FIFA enforced a ban on numerous foreign players in Hong Kong, including Swainston, as he did not have a Hong Kong passport, thus making him a foreign player. This ruling was eventually overturned, and Swainston made his professional debut on 7 April 2017, coming on as a 69th-minute substitute for Hélio in a 10–0 victory against HKFC.

Loan to Hoi King 
On 24 July 2018, following a preseason friendly, Hoi King confirmed that they had acquired Swainston on loan.

On 25 August 2021, Swainston left Kitchee.

Eastern 
On 24 November 2022, Swainston joined Eastern. Mark would make his debut in the 3-0 victory over HKFC in the Hong Kong FA Cup quarter-finals, coming on as a substitute for Leon Jones.

Career statistics

Club

Notes

Honours
Kitchee
 Hong Kong Premier League: 2019–20
 Hong Kong Sapling Cup: 2019–20

References

External links
 
 

1999 births
Living people
Filipino footballers
Filipino people of English descent
Citizens of the Philippines through descent
Association football midfielders
Hong Kong Premier League players
Kitchee SC players
Hoi King SA players
Eastern Sports Club footballers
Filipino expatriate footballers
Filipino expatriate sportspeople in Hong Kong
People educated at Island School